Vriesea castaneobulbosa is a plant species in the genus Vriesea, native to Costa Rica.

References

castaneobulbosa
Flora of Costa Rica